Columbus High School can refer to a number of high schools in the United States:

Columbus High School (Downey, California), a public secondary high school in California
Columbus High School (Columbus, Georgia), a liberal arts magnet school in Georgia
Columbus High School (Waterloo, Iowa), a Catholic secondary school in Iowa
Columbus High School (Columbus, Kansas), a public secondary high school in Kansas
Columbus High School (Columbus, Mississippi), a public secondary high school in Mississippi
Columbus High School (Columbus, Montana) in Columbus, Montana
Columbus High School (Columbus, Nebraska), a public secondary high school in Columbus, Nebraska
Columbus High School (Texas) in Columbus, Texas
:Category:High schools in Columbus, Ohio

Similarly named
Christopher Columbus High School (Miami-Dade County, Florida), a Catholic secondary school
Christopher Columbus High School (Bronx, New York), a public secondary school
Columbus Alternative High School in Columbus, Ohio
Columbus Catholic High School (Marshfield, Wisconsin)
Columbus Community High School in Columbus Junction, Iowa
Columbus East High School and Columbus North High School in Columbus, Indiana
Columbus Grove High School in Columbus Grove, Ohio
Columbus Senior High School, a public secondary high school in Columbus, Wisconsin
East Columbus High School in Lake Waccamaw, North Carolina
South Columbus High School in Tabor City, North Carolina
West Columbus High School in Cerro Gordo, North Carolina